The Toronto International Film Festival NETPAC Prize is an annual film award, presented by the Network for the Promotion of Asian Cinema to honour the best film from the Asia-Pacific region screened at the Toronto International Film Festival. The award was presented for the first time in 2012.

Winners

References

NETPAC
Asian film awards